Mount Pleasant School or Mt. Pleasant School may refer to:

in Canada
Mount Pleasant School (Ontario, Canada)

in New Zealand
Mount Pleasant School (Christchurch)

in the United States
(by state)
Mt. Pleasant School (Alamosa, Colorado), listed on the NRHP in Colorado
Mount Pleasant School (St. Louis, Missouri), listed on the NRHP in Missouri
Mount Pleasant High School Mechanical Arts Building, Mount Pleasant, UT, listed on the NRHP in Utah
Mt. Pleasant School (Gerrardstown, West Virginia), listed on the NRHP in West Virginia

in Zimbabwe
Mount Pleasant School (Joshua Nkomo High School)(Harare, Zimbabwe)

See also
Mount Pleasant Area School District, in Pennsylvania
Mount Pleasant High School (disambiguation)
Mount Pleasant (disambiguation)